Australia participated at the 1986 Commonwealth Games in Edinburgh, Scotland in  24 July and 2 August 1986. . It was Australia's thirteenth appearance at the Commonwealth Games, having competed at every Games since their inception in 1930. Australia won medals in eleven of the eleven sports that it entered

Medalists
The following Australian competitors won medals at the games.

| style="text-align:left; width:78%; vertical-align:top;"|

| width="22%" align="left" valign="top" |

Officials

Chef de Mission & General Manager - Arthur Tunstall 
Assistant General Managers - John Boultbee, Sol Spitalnic  
Manageress Extra Sports - Marjorie Nelson  
Administrative Officer - Peter Anderson  
Transport Officer - Ray Godkin  
Office Assistants - Lynne Bates, Jeanette Brown  
Attache - Kenneth Breechin  
Advance Party - Peggy Tunstall  
Medical - Team Doctors - Dr Christopher Gale, Dr Brian Sando ; Physiotherapists - Thomas Dobson, Peter Duras ; Masseur - Michael Kewley ; Chiropractor - Noel Patterson  
Section Officials - Athletics Manager - Ray Drury, Assistant Managers - Margaret Mahoney, Maurie Plant, Coach Co-ordinator - John Boas, Tony Benson, Merv Kemp, Norm Osborne, Tony Rice ' Badminton Manager - Don Stockins, Coach - Charles Stapleton ; Lawn bowls Manager - Roderick Wishart , Men Coach - Kenneth Pearce, Ladies Coach - Jean McKinnin ; Boxing Manager - Leslie Harrod, Coach - Bruce Farthing ; Cycling Manager - Jock Bullen , Track Coach - Charlie Walsh, Road Coach - Brian Gould, Mechanic - Bob Farley ; Rowing Manager - Stephen Hinchy, Assistant Manager/Doctor - Dr Bill Webb, Coaches - Reinhold Batschi, Brian Dalton, Geoffrey Hunter, Noel Langton, Robert Marlow, Brian Richardson, Peter Shakespear, David Yates ; Shooting Manager - Alastair Macpherson , Fullbore Coach - John Collinson, Smallbore Coach - David MacFarlane, Pistol Coach - Tibor Gonczol, Clay Target Coach - Peter Quire ; Swimming Manager - Tom Brazier , Assistant Manager - Evelyn Dill-Macky, Head Coach - Terry Buck , Coaches - Graeme Brown, Joe King, Laurie Lawrence, Bill Sweetenham, Ken Wood ; Doctor - Peter Fricker, Physiologist - Robert Treffene , Psychologist - Jeffrey Bond ; Diving Manager - Bill Richards, Coach - Bruce Prance ; Synchronised Swimming Manager/Coach - Stephan Critoph ; Weightlifting Manager - Bruce Walsh, Coach - Lyn Jones, Michael Noonan ; Wrestling Manager - Reg Marsh, Coach - Witold Rejilich

See also
 Australia at the 1984 Summer Olympics
 Australia at the 1988 Summer Olympics

References

External links 
Commonwealth Games Australia Results Database

1986
Nations at the 1986 Commonwealth Games
Commonwealth Games